Camarines Norte's 2nd congressional district is one of the two congressional districts of the Philippines in Camarines Norte. It has been represented in the House of Representatives of the Philippines since 2010. Previously included in Camarines Norte's at-large congressional district, it includes the eastern half of the province, bordering Camarines Sur. It is currently represented in the 19th Congress by Rosemarie C. Panotes of the PDP–Laban.

Representation history

Election results

2010

2013

2016

2019

2022

See also
Legislative districts of Camarines Norte

References

Congressional districts of the Philippines
Politics of Camarines Norte
2009 establishments in the Philippines
Congressional districts of the Bicol Region
Constituencies established in 2009